Donja Suvaja may refer to:

 Donja Suvaja, Bosnia and Herzegovina, a village near Bosanska Krupa
 Donja Suvaja, Croatia, a village near Gračac